Hedyosmum cumbalense is a species of tree in the Chloranthaceae family. It is native to South America.

References 

cumbalense
Trees of Colombia
Trees of Peru
Trees of Ecuador